The 1973–74 NHL season was the 57th season of the National Hockey League. The Philadelphia Flyers won the Stanley Cup championship, the team's first. The team was the first of the post-1967 teams to win the Cup.

League business
With owner Charles O. Finley unable to find a buyer, the league took over operation of the troubled California Golden Seals in February 1974. Fred Glover then resigned as manager-coach. Garry Young,
who had served a previous hitch as general manager, agreed to return.
Marshall Johnston, a defenseman for the Seals, retired and took over
as coach.

Regular season
The Philadelphia Flyers, who developed the nickname "Broad Street Bullies" because of their physical style of play, dethroned the Chicago Black Hawks as the West Division champions behind the dominant play of Bobby Clarke and Bernie Parent.

The New York Rangers were floundering under new coach Larry Popein
and were in danger of missing the playoffs, and Emile Francis took over the coaching reins. The Rangers then improved enough to get into the playoffs.

Tragedy hit the NHL in the early morning hours of February 21rst when
44 year-old Buffalo Sabres defenseman Tim Horton was killed in an
automobile accident. He had been returning to Buffalo from Toronto at
the time.

In the East Division, the Boston Bruins regained the top spot in the East and the league, behind an ongoing offensive juggernaut that saw Bruins' players finish 1–2–3–4 in NHL scoring (Phil Esposito, Bobby Orr, Ken Hodge, and Wayne Cashman) for the second and most recent time in league history.

Final standings

Playoffs
The playoffs began on April 9 with the first round, which was played between divisional opponents. The top teams all won their first rounds, with one mild upset, as the third-place New York Rangers defeated the second-place Montreal Canadiens, marking the third straight year that they had defeated the defending  Stanley Cup champions in the first round. In the second round, the teams played an inter-divisional round to determine the finalists. The Eastern champion Boston Bruins took on the Western's second-place Chicago Black Hawks, while the Western champion Philadelphia Flyers took on the New York Rangers. Boston won its series in six games to take one Finals spot, while Philadelphia won its series against the New York Rangers in seven games to make the team's first Finals appearance. In doing so, the Flyers became the first-ever post 1967 NHL expansion team to win a playoff series against an Original Six opponent. In the Finals, the Flyers won the series in six games against the Bruins to win not only the franchise's first championship but also to become the first post 1967 NHL expansion team and thus the first non 'Original Six' NHL team to win the Stanley Cup since the Montreal Maroons in 1935.

Playoff bracket

Quarterfinals

(E1) Boston Bruins vs. (E4) Toronto Maple Leafs

The Boston Bruins finished first in the league with 113 points. The Toronto Maple Leafs finished fourth in the East Division with 86 points. This was the 13th playoff meeting between these two teams. Toronto lead 8–4 in previous meetings. Boston won their most recent meeting in five games in the 1972 Stanley Cup Quarterfinals. Boston won four of the six games in this year's regular season series.

(E2) Montreal Canadiens vs. (E3) New York Rangers

The Montreal Canadiens finished second in the East Division with 99 points. The New York Rangers finished third with 94 points. This was the 11th playoff meeting between these two teams with the teams splitting the ten previous series. They last met in the 1972 Stanley Cup Quarterfinals which New York won in six games. Montreal won four of the six games in this year's regular season series.

(W1) Philadelphia Flyers vs. (W4) Atlanta Flames

The Philadelphia Flyers finished first in the West Division and second in the league with 112 points. The Atlanta Flames finished fourth with 74 points, the lowest points earned by any playoff team in 1974. The Atlanta Flames made their first playoff appearance in their second season after entering the league in the previous year. This was the first playoff series meeting between these two teams. The teams split this year's six-game regular season series.

(W2) Chicago Black Hawks vs. (W3) Los Angeles Kings

The Chicago Black Hawks finished second in the West Division with 105 points. The Los Angeles Kings finished third in the West Division with 78 points. This was the first playoff series meeting between these two teams. Chicago won this year's six-game regular season series earning eight of twelve points.

Semifinals

(E1) Boston Bruins vs. (W2) Chicago Black Hawks

This was the fourth playoff meeting between these two teams with Boston winning all three previous series. Boston won their most recent meeting in a four-game sweep in the 1970 Stanley Cup Semifinals. Chicago won this year's five-game regular season series earning seven of ten points.

(W1) Philadelphia Flyers vs. (E3) New York Rangers

This was the first playoff meeting between these two teams. New York won this year's five-game regular season series earning six of ten points.

Stanley Cup Finals

This was the first playoff meeting between these two teams. The Bruins made their thirteenth Finals appearance; winning in their last appearance in 1972 where they defeated the New York Rangers in six games. The Flyers made their first Finals appearance in their seventh season since entering the league in the 1967–68 NHL season. Boston won this year's five-game regular season series earning seven of ten points. Boston was the prohibitive favorite entering the series.

However, the Philadelphia Flyers stunned the Bruins in six games to become the first non-Original Six team to win the Stanley Cup since 1935 and the first expansion team to do so since the league began expanding in 1967.

Awards
A new award, the Jack Adams for the best coach, was introduced for this season. The first winner was Fred Shero of the Philadelphia Flyers.

All-Star teams

Player statistics

Scoring leaders
Note: GP = Games played, G = Goals, A = Assists, Pts = Points, PIM = Penalties in minutes

Source: NHL.

Leading goaltenders
Note: GP = Games played; Min = Minutes played; GA = Goals against; GAA = Goals against average; W = Wins; L = Losses; T = Ties; SO = Shutouts

Other statistics
 Plus-minus leader:  Bobby Orr, Boston Bruins

Coaches

East
Boston Bruins: Bep Guidolin
Buffalo Sabres: Joe Crozier
Detroit Red Wings: Ted Garvin and Alex Delvecchio
Montreal Canadiens: Scotty Bowman
New York Islanders: Al Arbour
New York Rangers: Larry Popein and Emile Francis
Toronto Maple Leafs: Red Kelly
Vancouver Canucks: Phil Maloney

West
Atlanta Flames: Bernie Geoffrion
California Golden Seals: Fred Glover and Marshall Johnston
Chicago Black Hawks: Billy Reay
Los Angeles Kings: Bob Pulford
Minnesota North Stars: Jack Gordon and Parker MacDonald
Philadelphia Flyers: Fred Shero
Pittsburgh Penguins: Ken Schinkel and Marc Boileau
St. Louis Blues: Jean-Guy Talbot and Lou Angotti

Debuts
The following is a list of players of note who played their first NHL game in 1973–74 (listed with their first team, asterisk(*) marks debut in playoffs):
Eric Vail, Atlanta Flames
Tom Lysiak, Atlanta Flames
Peter McNab, Buffalo Sabres
Darcy Rota, Chicago Black Hawks
Blake Dunlop, Minnesota North Stars
Bob Gainey, Montreal Canadiens
Michel Larocque, Montreal Canadiens
Denis Potvin, New York Islanders
Chico Resch, New York Islanders
Dave Lewis, New York Islanders
Al MacAdam, Philadelphia Flyers
Blaine Stoughton, Pittsburgh Penguins
John Davidson, St. Louis Blues
Inge Hammarstrom, Toronto Maple Leafs
Borje Salming, Toronto Maple Leafs
Lanny McDonald, Toronto Maple Leafs
Bob Dailey, Vancouver Canucks
Dennis Ververgaert, Vancouver Canucks

Last games
The following is a list of players of note that played their last game in the NHL in 1973–74 (listed with their last team):
Tim Horton, Buffalo Sabres
Alex Delvecchio, Detroit Red Wings
Dean Prentice, Minnesota North Stars
Gump Worsley, Minnesota North Stars
Frank Mahovlich, Montreal Canadiens
Jacques Laperriere, Montreal Canadiens
Barry Ashbee, Philadelphia Flyers
Orland Kurtenbach, Vancouver Canucks

NOTE: Frank Mahovlich would finish his major professional career in the World Hockey Association.

See also 
 List of Stanley Cup champions
 1973 NHL Amateur Draft
 1973–74 NHL transactions
 27th National Hockey League All-Star Game
 National Hockey League All-Star Game
 List of WHA seasons
 1973 in sports
 1974 in sports

References
 
 
 
 

Notes

External links
Hockey Database
NHL.com

 
1973–74 in Canadian ice hockey by league
1973–74 in American ice hockey by league